The Good Traitor is a 2020 Danish drama film about Henrik Kauffmann and the signing of the Greenland treaty with the United States after the Nazi occupation of Denmark during World War II.

Cast
 Ulrich Thomsen as Henrik Kauffmann
 Denise Gough as Charlotte Kauffmann
 Mikkel Boe Følsgaard as Povl Bang-Jensen
 Zoë Tapper as Zilla Sears
 Burn Gorman as Berle
 Henry Goodman as Franklin D. Roosevelt
  as 
 Ross McCall as Mason Sears
 Pixie Davies as Poppin Sears
 Amber Fernée as Tilda Kauffmann
 Rosemary Aburrow as Lisa Kauffmann
 Søren Sætter-Lassen as 
 Nicholas Blane as Winston Churchill
  as Lauring
 Henrik Noël Olesen as Arno
  as Statsminister Buhl
 Scott Alexander Young as General Hobbs
 Robert Jackson as Ejendomsmágler

Reception
On review aggregator website Rotten Tomatoes, The Good Traitor holds an approval rating of  based on  reviews. The New York Times complimented, The Good Traitor "shows how the energies of public and private worlds course back and forth". Variety was less complimentary, "Fascinating backroom politics circa WWII are undermined by banal marital melodrama in Danish director Christina Rosendahl's The Good Traitor, resulting in a so-so period drama that raises more questions than it answers."

References

External links
 

2020 films
2020 drama films
Danish drama films
2020s Danish-language films
2020s English-language films
Films set in the 1940s
2020 multilingual films
Danish multilingual films
Films directed by Christina Rosendahl